Byrhtferth was a priest and monk who lived at Ramsey Abbey in Huntingdonshire (now part of Cambridgeshire) in England. He had a deep impact on the intellectual life of later Anglo-Saxon England and wrote many computistic, hagiographic, and historical works. He was a leading man of science and best known as the author of many different works (although he may not have written many of them). His Manual (Enchiridion), a scientific textbook, is Byrhtferth's best known work.

He studied with Abbo of Fleury, who was invited to Ramsey Abbey by Oswald of Worcester to help teach.  Abbo was there during the period 985 to 987, and became a large influence on Byhrtferth who was interested in the same studies, such as history, logic, astronomy, and mathematics. We do not have contemporary biographies of Byrhtferth, and the only information we have is the one in his Manual and his Preface.

Writings
Byrhtferth's signature appears on only two unpublished works, his Latin and Old English Manual, and Latin Preface. He also composed a Latin life of St. Egwin, compiled a chronicle of Northumbrian history in the 990s, wrote a Latin life of Oswald of Worcester (the Vita Oswaldi) about the year 1000, and it is suggested that he is responsible for the early sections of the Historia regum, or History of the Kings, attributed to Simeon of Durham.  This last attribution is based on the similarity of the style between Simeon and Byrhtferth. The last of Byrhtferth's works is an unsigned fragment of Old English text on computus in the Manuscript BL Cotton Caligula A.xv, fols. MS 142v–143r.  It is attributed to him because of the stylistic similarity to the Old English that he wrote in the Manual.

Byrhtferth has also been credited with Latin commentaries on Bede's De natura rerum and De temporum ratione (first attributed to him by John Herwagen) and a Vita S. Dunstani signed "B" (first attributed to him by Jean Mabillon). However, many scholars argue that these works were not written by Byrhtferth, but instead were a compilation of material by several writers in the late ninth and early tenth centuries.  This is argued because of the smooth, polished style of these works in comparison with the styles of the only signed works, the Manual and the Preface.

Bodl. Ashmole MS 328 preserves Byrhtferth's Latin Enchiridion, or Manual.  It is written in Latin and Old English and the largest part is that of a computus similar to the one in Preface.  It touches on the belief that the divine order of the universe can be perceived through the study of numbers and can be of great reference for the study of medieval number symbolism. It also contains treatises on rhetorical and grammatical subjects, a table of weights and measures, and three theological tracts on the ages of the world, the loosing of Satan and the eight capital sins.

Preface
St John's College, Oxford MS 17  contains several computistical works by Bede and Helperic, and a computus which includes the Latin Epilogus, or Preface, by Byrhtferth.  He also constructed a full-page diagram showing the harmony of the universe, and suggesting correspondences among cosmological, numerological, and physiological aspects of the world.  Other items in the manuscript may in fact have been written by Byrhtferth, but it cannot be proved.  Also, he may have compiled most of these things from works that Abbo of Fleury left behind at Ramsey Abbey after his death.

Published works

Byrhtferth's Manual (AD 1011) (1929). Edited from ms. Ashmole 328 in the Bodleian library. With an introduction, translation, sources, vocabulary, glossary of technical terms, appendices and seventeen plates by Samuel J. Crawford. Published for Early English Text Society, Original series, 127.
 Byrhtferth's Enchiridion, edited and translated by Peter S. Baker and Michael Lapidge.  Oxford: Published for the Early English Text Society, Supplementary series, 15, by the Oxford University Press, 1995.

References

External links
 
 Anonymous life of Oswald (in Latin), pg. 399 ff.

970s births
1020s deaths
11th-century English historians
Christian hagiographers
English Christian monks
10th-century English historians
English chroniclers
11th-century English writers
Medieval English mathematicians
Medieval English astronomers
11th-century astronomers
11th-century mathematicians
11th-century Latin writers